Intruda is a monotypic genus of South Pacific ground spiders containing the single species, Intruda signata. It was first described by Raymond Robert Forster in 1979, and has only been found in Australia and in New Zealand.

References

Gnaphosidae
Monotypic Araneomorphae genera
Spiders of Australia
Spiders of New Zealand
Taxa named by Raymond Robert Forster